Sutton-under-Brailes is a village and civil parish  south of Warwick, in the Stratford-on-Avon district of Warwickshire, England. Adjacent parishes are Barcheston, Brailes, Cherington, Stourton and Whichford. In 2001 the parish had a population of 89.

History 
The name "Sutton" means 'South farm/settlement', the "Brailes" part referring to being 2 miles south of Brailes. Sutton-under-Brailes was recorded in the Domesday Book as Sudtune. Sutton under Brailes was formerly a detached parish of Gloucestershire, in the 1840s it was transferred to Warwickshire.

Landmarks 
There are 17 listed buildings in Sutton-under-Brailes. The parish church is dedicated to St Thomas a Becket.

References

Source

 

Villages in Warwickshire
Civil parishes in Warwickshire
Stratford-on-Avon District